The NOAA Central Library is the flagship library of the National Oceanic and Atmospheric Administration’s (NOAA) network of over 20 research libraries. It is also a selective federal depository library for United States federal government publications.[6]

Location
The NOAA Central Library is located on the second floor of NOAA Building III on the Silver Spring Metro Center campus, near the Silver Spring Metro station.

History
In 1970, with the formation of NOAA, the libraries of the National Weather Service, the Coast Survey, and National Marine Fisheries Service (NMFS) merged to become the NOAA Central library.

Part of the NOAA Central library collection is from the former United States Weather Bureau library, itself descended from the United States Signal Corps library.

The library was previously located in Rockville, Maryland just northwest of Old Georgetown Road until 1993, when it moved to its current location in Silver Spring, Maryland. Its website was established in 1995.

Patrons
NOAA employees have full access to the library’s e-resources and physical holdings. Visiting scientists, contracted labor, and other NOAA affiliates can gain access through their federal supervisor. Members of the public can access the library by calling in advance. The library is open from 8:30 am through 4:30 pm, Monday through Friday, and is closed on federal holidays.

Contents
The library subscribes to over one thousand peer-reviewed journals in print and electronic formats, and is the official repository of all NOAA publications. It also holds works and artifacts pertaining to the history of NOAA. Its microfilm collection includes decades of surface weather observations and surface weather analyses from the United States and Japan.

The library maintains an online photo collection of over 30,000 images taken by NOAA staff. Some of those images are also hosted on the NOAA Flickr account.

Role within data digitization
The NOAA Central Library has been active within the Climate Digital Modernization Program (CDMP), which is headquartered at the National Climatic Data Center (NCDC) in Asheville, North Carolina. Projects have included digitizing foreign climate data books, the United States Daily Weather Map series, and Monthly Weather Review articles. Researchers at the library from the Hydrometeorological Prediction Center (HPC, now the Weather Prediction Center or WPC) are digitizing the library's microfilm North American and Northern Hemispheric map collections, originally created by the National Meteorological Center (NMC).

Awards
In 1999 the NOAA Central Library organized over 500 NOAA websites under a single locator and created a significant digital image library of meteorological images from the 1800s to the 1950s, which won the Federal Library and Information Center Committee award.

References

External links
 NOAA Central Library
 NOAA photo library
 NOAA photo library on Flickr

National Oceanic and Atmospheric Administration

Research libraries in the United States